"All Over the World" is a song by the Electric Light Orchestra (ELO). It is featured in the 1980 feature film Xanadu in a sequence with the film's stars Olivia Newton-John, Gene Kelly, and Michael Beck. The song also appears on the soundtrack album Xanadu, and was performed in the 2007 Broadway musical Xanadu.

Released after the single "Xanadu" (a collaboration with Olivia Newton-John), this was the third Top 20 ELO single released from the 1980 soundtrack, peaking at number 13 on the US Billboard Hot 100.

The sequence in the Xanadu movie was filmed on location at the Beverly Hills Fiorucci store.

One section of the lyrics lists a number of famous cities; London, Hamburg, Paris, Rome, Rio de Janeiro, Hong Kong, Tokyo, Los Angeles, New York City, Amsterdam and Monte Carlo. The last place named in the list is Shard End, the suburb of Birmingham, England where Jeff Lynne was born.

Cash Box called it "souped up '50s and '60s pop at its best," and praised the hook. Billboard called it one of ELO's "catchier tunes." Record World said that "a spirited chorus, triumphant keyboards & multitudinous handclaps carry the joyous, uplifting message."

This song featured prominently in the trailer for the Simon Pegg science fiction comedy movie Paul and also played at the end of the film before the credits.

Personnel
Credits adapted from the album Xanadu.
 Jeff Lynne – lead vocals, backing vocals, electric guitars, acoustic guitars, synthesizers
 Bev Bevan – drums, percussion, tympani
 Richard Tandy – pianos, synthesizers, keyboards
 Kelly Groucutt – bass guitar, backing vocals
 Louis Clark – strings

Chart performance

Weekly charts

Year-end charts

References

External links

1980 singles
1980 songs
Electric Light Orchestra songs
Jet Records singles
MCA Records singles
Song recordings produced by Jeff Lynne
Songs written by Jeff Lynne
Songs from Xanadu (film)